Tomb of the Pistolero or Grave of the Gunfighter is a 1964 Spanish black and white western film directed by Amando de Ossorio, written by H. S. Valdés and starring George Martin, Mercedes Alonso, Silvia Solar, Todd Martens and Jack Taylor. It is composed by Daniel White.

Cast

References

External links
 

Films directed by Amando de Ossorio
1964 Western (genre) films
1964 films
Spanish Western (genre) films
Spanish black-and-white films
Films shot in Madrid